Rosebud Kitmaster is the brand name of a short-lived but critically acclaimed range of plastic assembly kits, manufactured in the United Kingdom by Rosebud Dolls Ltd of Raunds, Northamptonshire. Introduced from May 1959, the range rapidly expanded to include 34 models of railway locomotives and coaches in OO, HO and TT scales, and eventually, one motorcycle in 1:16 scale. 

The assets of Rosebud Kitmaster were sold to Airfix Products Ltd in late 1962. Nine locomotives and the motorcycle were later re-issued under the Airfix brand. The Airfix company was taken over by Humbrol in 1986, but the company went down in August 2006. Hornby then acquired the Humbrol and Airfix brand names, being the current holder of the Kitmaster name.

Overview 
The range comprised mainly British railway rolling stock but there were a few kits of other subjects. The range consisted of 34 kits of individual locomotives or carriages, a model of the Ariel Arrow motorcycle, the "Fireball XL5" rocket, parts to motorise the railway kits (using a motorised box wagon supplied pre-built, or a motor bogie) and three railway presentation sets:

 P1: 100 Years of British Steam - this included kits of Stephenson's Rocket, the Stirling 8' Single locomotive and a Coronation class locomotive in 00 scale.
 P2: Battle of Britain Set - this contained a Battle of Britain class locomotive and three BR Mark 1 coaches in 00 scale.
 P3: TT3 Royal Scot Set - this contained a Royal Scot class locomotive and four BR Mark 1 coaches in TT3 (3mm = 1 foot) scale.

All of the moulds for the kits produced by Rosebud Dolls Ltd under the Kitmaster name were sold to Airfix Products Ltd in 1962, and later in 1982 some of them were sold to Dapol Model Railways. However, not all of the kits were passed over and several were destroyed by General Mills / Palitoy at the Glenfield warehouse where they had been stored following the liquidation of Airfix Products Ltd that year. As such, some Kitmaster kits are extremely collectable and can be very valuable to a dedicated collector. Prices of unmade kits for the rarer models, such as the 00 gauge LMS Beyer-Garratt locomotive, can reach as much as £100.

Before its demise, the company announced the introduction of a number of kits that never knowingly entered production, including the LNER Flying Scotsman, Southern Railway Class USA Tank engine and Canadian National U-4A.

Models 

The OO/HO gauge models consisted of the following types; all OO scale unless shown as HO:

 Kit No 1 - Stephenson's Rocket
 Kit No 2 - BR Class 08 diesel shunter locomotive
 Kit No 3 - USA 4-4-0 Locomotive The General HO scale
 Kit No 4 - LMS Coronation Class locomotive Duchess of Gloucester
 Kit No 5 - SR 4-4-0 Schools Class locomotive Harrow
 Kit No 6 - Lancashire & Yorkshire 0-4-0 saddle tank "pug" locomotive
 Kit No 7 - GWR Prairie Tank locomotive
 Kit No 8 - Italian 0-6-0 tank locomotive
 Kit No 9 - Stirling 8 ft Single locomotive
 Kit No 10 - English Electric Deltic Prototype diesel locomotive
 Kit No 11 - SR 4-6-2 Battle of Britain Class locomotive Biggin Hill
 Kit No 12 - Swiss Crocodile electric locomotive
 Kit No 13 - BR Standard Mk1 Corridor Composite Coach (in Maroon or Green)
 Kit No 14 - BR Standard Mk1 Corridor or Open 2nd Coach (in Maroon or Green)
 Kit No 15 - BR Standard Mk1 Corridor Brake 2nd Coach (in Maroon or Green)
 Kit No 19 - German 2-6-2 locomotive "Baureihe 23" class 23
 Kit No 22 - BR Standard 2-10-0 9F locomotive Evening Star (with number transfers for three other members of the class that were black and unnamed, so one of four possible models in one kit)
 Kit No 23 - SNCF Class 241P 'Mountain' locomotive
 Kit No 24 - GWR 4-4-0 locomotive City of Truro
 Kit No 25 - LMS 2-6-0+0-6-2 Beyer-Garratt Locomotive
 Kit No 26 - 0-6-0ST "Austerity" class J94
 Kit No 27 - German DB B4yge Coach - HO scale
 Kit No 28 - BR Standard Mk1 Restaurant 1st Coach with interior (in Maroon or Green)
 Kit No 29 - French SNCF A9myfi "INOX" stainless steel coach - HO scale
 Kit No 30 - BR 2-6-0 Standard Class 4 'Mogul'
 Kit No 31 - Midland Blue Pullman power car
 Kit No 32 - Midland Blue Pullman kitchen car
 Kit No 33 - Midland Blue Pullman parlour car
 Kit No 34 - New York Central 'Hudson' 4-6-4 steam locomotive - HO scale

The TT gauge models were: -

 Kit No 16 - LMS 4-6-0 locomotive Royal Scot
 Kit No 17 - BR Standard Mk1 Corridor Brake 2nd Coach (in Maroon or Green)
 Kit No 18 - BR Standard Mk1 Corridor Composite Coach (in Maroon or Green)
 Kit No 20 - BR Standard Mk1 Corridor or Open 2nd Coach (in Maroon or Green)
 Kit No 21 - BR Standard Mk1 Restaurant 1st Coach with interior (in Maroon or Green)

The motorisation units were:
 KM1 - Motorised BR Mk1 bogie - designed to be fitted inside Kit No.15, the BR Mk1 Brake Second , to push passenger locomotives.
 KM2 - Motorised Box Van - An RB3 Refrigerated Van which could be marshalled behind freight locomotives in order to push them along.

The final model released by Rosebud Kitmaster Ltd, in their packaging, was the motorcycle:
 Kit No 60 - Ariel Arrow Super Sports model 1960 in 1/16th scale

A subsequent model, manufactured by the Hermes Supply Company (a subsidiary of Airfix) was marketed as "your Kitmaster model" in 1963:
 No kit number - Gerry Anderson's Fireball XL5 in 1/100th scale

The Hermes Supply Co also supplied five kits from remaindered Kitmaster stock in plain packaging to fulfil a Nabisco promotion which ran on Shredded Wheat packets during early 1963. These were:
 Kit No 2 - BR Class 08 diesel shunter locomotive
 Kit No 10 - English Electric Deltic Prototype diesel locomotive
 Kit No 15 - BR Standard Mk1 Corridor Brake 2nd Coach (in Maroon or Green)
 Kit No 22 - BR Standard 2-10-0 9F locomotive Evening Star
 Kit No 28 - BR Standard Mk1 Restaurant 1st Coach with interior (in Maroon or Green)

Bibliography

References

External links
 Kitmaster Model Railways collector page
 Brand history and models on The Brighton Toy Museum

Model railroad manufacturers
Model manufacturers of the United Kingdom